Gonzalo Galván Castillo (19 January 1951 – 22 November 2020) was a Mexican Roman Catholic bishop.

Galván Castillo was born in Mexico and was ordained to the priesthood in 1977. He served as bishop of the Roman Catholic Diocese of Autlán, Mexico, from 2004 until 2015.

Castillo died from COVID-19 in 2020.

Notes

21st-century Roman Catholic bishops in Mexico
1951 births
2020 deaths
Deaths from the COVID-19 pandemic in Mexico